Benny Peled (April 18, 1928 – July 13, 2002) was the commander of the Israeli Air Force during the Yom Kippur War and Operation Entebbe. He retired with the rank of Aluf (major general).

Biography and career
He was born Binyamin Weidenfeld in Tel Aviv, Mandatory Palestine, and Hebraized his name to Peled. His father, Arie Weidenfeld, was a member of a family who came to Israel during the First Aliya from Romania, and settled in Rosh Pinna. His father worked in the public works department of the British mandate government and was responsible, among other things, for building airfields. His mother, Yona Weidenfeld (né Gurfinkel), came from Poland in 1925. Peled was the eldest son, and had a younger brother and sister. 

Peled studied in Gymnasia Herzelia and his teachers included Shaul Tchernichovsky, Yehuda Burla and Zvi Nishri, who educated him in the spirit of Zionism and democracy. After a brief term as a teenager with a British Mandate Palestine military police unit, he started as a mechanic in the beginnings of the Israeli Air Force. During the 1948 Arab–Israeli War he had assembled the first Messerschmitt Bf 109 which had arrived in Israel dismantled. He then became a pilot and fought in the Independence war.

After the war, he was one of the pioneers of the jet age in the IAF. He commanded the first Meteor, Ouragan and Mystère squadrons. In 1956 Peled participated in Operation Kadesh, the Suez or Sinai campaign, in which his Mystere jet was shot down by Egyptian anti-aircraft fire and he became the first Israeli pilot to use an ejector seat. He was rescued by an IAF Piper light aircraft.

Peled was a base commander during the 1967 Six-Day War. He became commander of the IAF in 1973 when he was 45 years old. In that capacity he led the Israeli Air Force in the Yom Kippur War, successfully overcoming early setbacks. In July 1976 he planned and executed the air component of Operation Entebbe, the planned rescue of hostages held by terrorist hijackers in Entebbe, Uganda.

Post-military
In 1978, Peled became the president of Elbit Systems, a position he held until 1985.

Peled was played by John Saxon in the film Raid on Entebbe (1977).

References

External links

 

1928 births
2002 deaths
Israeli Air Force generals
Israeli aviators
Israeli Jews
Israeli people of Romanian-Jewish descent
Israeli people of the Yom Kippur War
Operation Entebbe
People from Tel Aviv
Technion – Israel Institute of Technology alumni
Burials at Kiryat Shaul Cemetery